We'll Never Let Our Old Flag Fall is a World War I song written by Albert E. MacNutt and composed by M. F. Kelly. The song was first published in 1915 by Chappell & Co., in New York, NY.
The sheet music cover was illustrated by Starmer and features words with an eagle on a shield.

The sheet music can be found at the Pritzker Military Museum & Library.

References 

Bibliography
Parker, Bernard S. World War I Sheet Music 1. Jefferson: McFarland & Company, Inc., 2007. . 
Paas, John Roger. 2014. America sings of war: American sheet music from World War I. . 

1915 songs
Songs of World War I